John Ramm is an English comedian and actor.  He plays Raymond Box in the National Theatre of Brent, and has also appeared on film and television in Robin Hood ("Will You Tolerate This?"), The Palace, Foyle's War ("All Clear") and as Makepeace's neighbour in Shakespeare in Love.

On stage, he has appeared with the Royal Shakespeare Company in their 2004 Lope de Vega season, at the Chichester Festival Theatre, in a 2008 production of Ring Round the Moon at the Playhouse Theatre London, as Dogberry in Much Ado About Nothing in 2011, in the 2013 play The Low Road, and as Thomas More and Henry Norris in Mike Poulton's 2014-2015 stage adaptions of Wolf Hall and Bring Up The Bodies respectively. In 2016 he performed at the Orange Tree Theatre in Sheppey for which he received The Offie (Off West End Theatre Award) for Best Male Performance.

Ramm plays Sergeant Brunswick in the BBC Radio 4 comedy drama series Inspector Steine. In March 2022, he appeared in an episode of the BBC soap opera Doctors as Bix Banton.

External links

John Ramm at Chichester Festival Theatre

References

Year of birth missing (living people)
Living people
English male television actors
English male film actors
English male stage actors